Shibumi is a Michelin Guide-starred restaurant in Los Angeles, California.

See also 

 List of Michelin starred restaurants in Los Angeles and Southern California

References 

Michelin Guide starred restaurants in California
Restaurants in Los Angeles